Paramphilius teugelsi is a species of loach catfish found in Guinea and Sierra Leone in the Mamou and Kogon Rivers.  It grows to a length of 5.1 cm.

The fish is named in honor of Guy Teugels (1954-2003) who as the curator of fishes at the Musée Royale de l’Afrique Centrale contributed to the further knowledge of West-African freshwater fishes.

References 

 

Amphiliidae
Freshwater fish of West Africa
Taxa named by Paul Harvey Skelton
Fish described in 1989